Maccabi Ironi Bat Yam was an Israeli football club based in Bat Yam. The club played home matches at the 3,100-capacity Bat Yam Municipal Stadium.

History
The club was formed by a merger of Beitar Bat Yam and Maccabi Bat Yam. Following another merger, with Maccabi Holon, the club became known as Maccabi Holon Bat Yam and was placed in the South A division of Liga Bet. In 2004, after Hapoel Bat Yam dissolved, the club was renamed to Maccabi Ironi Bat Yam, and in its first season playing with that name, the club won the South A division, and was promoted to Liga Alef. In 2007–08 they won the South division of Liga Alef, and were promoted to Liga Artzit.

In 2008–09, the club was promoted to Liga Leumit, the second tier. In 2011–12 the club finished third bottom and relegated to Liga Alef.

The club dissolved at 25 August 2014, after chairman Yossi Elkobi gave the order to close the senior team, and did not register the club in the Israel Football Association.

Honours
Liga Alef
South Division champions 2007–08
Liga Bet
South A Division champions 2004–05

References

External links
 Maccabi Ironi Bat Yam Israel Football Association 

Ironi Bat Yam F.C.
Ironi Bat Yam F.C.
Association football clubs established in 2004
Association football clubs established in 2018
2004 establishments in Israel
2018 establishments in Israel
Association football clubs disestablished in 2014
Association football clubs disestablished in 2019
2014 disestablishments in Israel
2019 disestablishments in Israel
Sport in Bat Yam